, graduate from and professor at the Nagoya Institute of Technology from 2004, doctor of engineering granted by Tokyo Institute of Technology and CEO & CTO of 
Techno-Speech, Inc., was named Fellow of the Institute of Electrical and Electronics Engineers (IEEE) in 2014 for contributions to hidden Markov model-based speech synthesis. He was awarded Medal with Purple Ribbon in 2020.

Publications
Keiichi Tokuda et al.,  "Speaker adaptation and the evaluation of speaker similarity in the EMIME speech-to-speech translation project" (with Mirjam Wester, John Dines, Matthew Gibson, Hui Liang, Yi-Jian Wu, Lakshmi Saheer, Simon King, Keiichiro Oura, Philip N. Garner, William Byrne, Yong Guan, Teemu Hirsimäki, Reima Karhila, Mikko Kurimo, Matt Shannon, Sayaka Shiota, Jilei Tian & Junichi Yamagishi)
 Keiichi Tokuda et al., "Personalising speech-to-speech translation: Unsupervised cross-lingual speaker adaptation for HMM-based speech synthesis" Computer Speech & Language Vol. 27, Issue 2, Feb. 2013, pp. 420-437 (with JohnDines, Hui Lian,Lakshmi Saheer, Matthew Gibson, William Byrne, Keiichiro Oura, Junichi Yamagishi, Simon King, Mirjam Westerd, Teemu Hirsimäki, Reima Karhil & Mikko Kurimoe)
 Keiichi Tokuda et al., "THE BLIZZARD MACHINE LEARNING CHALLENGE 2017" 2017 IEEE Automatic Speech Recognition and Understanding Workshop (ASRU), 2017,  331-337 (with Kei Sawada, Simon King & Alan W. Black)
 Keiichi Tokuda et al, "Generalization of Thai Tone Contour in HMM-Based Speech Synthesis" 2017 Asia-Pacific Signal and Information Processing Association Annual Summit and Conference (APSIPA ASC), 2017, 1102-1105 (with Anocha Rugchatjaroen, Sittipong Saychum & Keiichiro Oura)

References 

Fellow Members of the IEEE
Living people
Year of birth missing (living people)